Lakhiganj is a village, a small Bazaar (market), a post office and a Gaon Panchayat in the Dhubri district of Assam, around 8 km north from  Bilasipara, (sub-divisional headquarters).  It is situated on the Bilasipara-Kokrajhar state highway, around 12 km from Kokrajhar town and 9 km from Fakiragram railway station.  The bazaar hosts weekly market on Monday and Friday. It has a small township comprising people of different backgrounds and as such they represent a mixed culture. The people of this Bazzar area basically speak Goalpariya, Assamese, although Marawari, Bihari and Bengalis’ are also there. The people are primarily dependent on small-scale business. However, it is surprising that this the place where Motram Surajmal Dugar first established a small firm in 1906 and now it is a big business house, named "the MS Dugar group of companies" operate all over India.

Lakhiganj has a post office with PIN/ZIP code 783 351 and a Gaon Panchayat office, called Lakhiganj Gaon Panchayat. The main educational institution is the Lakhiganj Higher Secondary School (Estd. 1952) and other schools include (Lakhiganj J. B. School (Estd. 1866), Lakhiganj Middle English Madrassa (Estd. 1928), Lakhiganj Maktab (Primary) School (Estd. 1928), Lakhiganj M. V. School, Lakhiganj Girls’ High School at Chokapara and Nabadaya Jatiya Bidyalaya). A three-doctor state dispensary takes care about the health problems while a police out post controls the law and order problems of the region.

A regional office of Jute Corporation of India (JCI) purchases, stores and operates from here. The MS Dugar group of companies provide warehousing facility to JCI. Lakhiganj P. G. Bank (now Assam Gramin Vikash Bank), a rural bank operates to cater the financial needs of the rural masses. Lakhiganj Jama Masjid cum Hafezia Madrassa, a Kali mandir and a Durga mandir are the main religious centers of the locality. Lakhiganj Bright Club cum Library is a popular recreational hub for the local youths.

References

India Census Report 2001
District Rural Development Agency, Dhubri
The MS Dugar Group of Companies

Dhubri
Villages in Dhubri district